Alexander Bache U.S. Coast Survey Line is a historic geodetic survey line located at Edisto Island, Charleston County, South Carolina. This base line was surveyed by Alexander Dallas Bache and his assistants during January 1850. They buried granite blocks at each endpoint and then placed a granite monument on top of each block.

It was listed on the National Register of Historic Places in 2007.

References

Monuments and memorials on the National Register of Historic Places in South Carolina
Government buildings completed in 1850
Buildings and structures in Charleston County, South Carolina
National Register of Historic Places in Charleston County, South Carolina